Iwan Gwyn Thomas  (born 5 January 1974) is a Welsh sprinter who represented Great Britain and Northern Ireland at the Olympic Games in the 400 metres, and Wales at the Commonwealth Games. Thomas is a former European, Commonwealth Games and World (4 × 400 m relay) champion.

Thomas is the former UK 400m record holder, with his time of 44.36s set in Birmingham on 13 July 1997 standing until Matthew Hudson-Smith broke the record in May 2022. He was also a member of the team which holds the UK 4 × 400 m Relay record of 2:56.60, set in Atlanta, USA in the Olympic final on 3 August 1996.

Thomas's coach for much of his running career was Mike Smith, formerly coach to British 400 m runners Roger Black, Todd Bennett and Paul Harmsworth also hurdler Kriss Akabusi. Thomas was made a Member of the Order of the British Empire (MBE) in 1998.

Athletics career
His initial athletics breakthrough came at the World Junior Championships in 1992 as part of the British 4x400 metres relay team that finished fifth. Thomas attended Stamford School and West London Institute of Higher Education, where he studied Sports Science and Geography.  While still at university, he took part in the 1994 Commonwealth Games 400 m where he reached the semi-finals, representing Wales.  From there, he was selected to represent Britain in the relay at the 1995 European Cup and secured his first championship gold medal.

At the 1996 Olympic Games in Atlanta, Thomas finished fifth in the final and took a silver medal in the 4 × 400m event (in which the team broke the UK record, which still stands). He also represented Britain in the 2000 Olympics but was not selected for the individual event and despite running the fastest leg for the British team in the 4 × 400 m relay, did not secure a medal (the team took 5th place in the final).

Thomas was a member of the Great Britain 4 × 400 m team at the 1997 World Championships in Athens. The team (Iwan Thomas, Roger Black, Jamie Baulch and Mark Richardson) finished second by 0.18 seconds to the United States. However, in 2008, US team member Antonio Pettigrew, who ran the second leg of the final, testified in the court case against trainer Trevor Graham that he had been aided by performance-
enhancing substances between 1997 and 2001, including the 1997 World Championships. As the International Amateur Athletics Federation did not, as of 2008, change results retrospectively more than eight years after the event, initially the GB team was not awarded the gold medal retrospectively, although Pettigrew had returned his medals won in that period.

On 7 January 2010 it was announced that Great Britain's 1997 World Championship 4 × 400 m relay team were to be awarded the gold medal they were denied by the disqualified USA team. New medals were minted for the ceremony, as not all of the American quartet returned the originals. Thomas received his gold medal in May 2010 in a presentation by Alun Ffred Jones at Cardiff Bay.

Thomas' career was hampered by injury including a stress fracture to his ankle in 1999 that required telescopic surgery. He was again injured in 2003 with damage to his Achilles. Further injury in 2004 ruled him out of the 2004 Olympic Games.
Thomas was selected in 2006 for the Welsh team for the 2006 Commonwealth Games in Melbourne, Australia, but was unable to compete due to an injury.

Iwan never officially retired from athletics but took the opportunity to do so when offered by Andy Goldstein on 3 July 2012 edition of the Andy Goldstien's Sports Bar on TalkSPORT. He remains the UK record-holder 
in the 4 × 400 m relay.

Personal life

His father was born to Welsh-born parents in Middlesex, whilst his mother's Welsh language speaking family were centred around the village of Llandderfel, Gwynedd. Iwan Thomas was born in Farnborough and now lives in Southampton.

After winning Deadline, he bought himself a Ducati 1098 motorcycle. Although a lifelong supporter of Tottenham Hotspur Football Club, in 2010 he became an ambassador for The Saints Foundation, the charity of Southampton F.C.

Thomas and his partner welcomed their first child, a boy, in December 2018. Teddy was diagnosed with Group B streptococcal infection and it was 10 days before he was released home. Teddy has made an excellent recovery, and Iwan Thomas has raised awareness of the illness and supported the charity Group B Strep Support.

Iwan confirmed on episode 5 of Channel 4's Celebrity Hunted that he and his wife are expecting their second baby. He confirmed via Instagram that their second baby, Dougie Albert Thomas, was born late January 2022.

Television work
Thomas worked as a guest presenter of the Children's television show Best of Friends, alongside Darren Campbell and Charles Ingram.

He is a regular panelist on BBC Two's Through The Keyhole, was a contestant on Superstars on both BBC One and Five and took part in BBC One's Hole in the Wall. He has also been a contestant on BBC One's Celebrity MasterChef, and The Real Hustle. 

Thomas was a regular guest of Channel 5's The Wright Stuff. He starred in Daily Cooks Challenge as a judge alongside presenter Antony Worrall Thompson.

In 2008, Thomas guest presented two episodes of Best of Friends, in the sports special with Darren Campbell and in the activities special with Zoe Salmon.

Thomas took part in a celebrity version of the children's TV show Jungle Run, along with some fellow Great Britain Olympians, including javelin thrower Steve Backley and swimmer Mark Foster.

Iwan took part in the celebrity games of the Million Pound Drop Live broadcast on Friday 10 August 2012.

Thomas is currently co-presenter of MotoGP Tonight on BT Sport alongside Craig Doyle. He can also be seen presenting the Chequered Flag show immediately following MotoGP races.

On 27 August 2015, Thomas was announced as a contestant in the 2015 series of Strictly Come Dancing. On 5 September 2015 it was announced Thomas had been paired with professional dancer Ola Jordan for the series. He was the first contestant to be eliminated.

In September 2016, Thomas was a presenter of the Paralympics Games in Rio for Channel 4 where he commentated on the athletics coverage presented from the Olympic Stadium.

In February 2017, Thomas was a guest at "dictionary corner" on Countdown, on Channel 4.

In 2022, Thomas took part in Celebrity Hunted for stand up to cancer. He was the only celebrity to win that series, with his teammate Richard Whitehead being caught earlier in the series.

Other activities
Thomas made a guest appearance as a cyclist at the final round of the 2008-09 Revolution series at Manchester Velodrome, competing in the 200m time trial.

Thomas took part in the London Marathon 2015.

Thomas joined the Ecover Sailing Team in 2009 as part of an Extreme 40 event. He was the fifth man on their boat on 31 July, racing catamarans around Egypt Point in Cowes, for a practice day of the iShares cup.

References

External links
 Official website
 
 Nuff Respect Agency bio
 Sprint Start – a scheme to improve children's fitness

1974 births
Living people
People from Farnborough, London
Athletes from London
British male sprinters
Welsh male sprinters
Commonwealth Games gold medallists for Wales
Commonwealth Games silver medallists for Wales
Commonwealth Games bronze medallists for Wales
Commonwealth Games medallists in athletics
Athletes (track and field) at the 1994 Commonwealth Games
Athletes (track and field) at the 1998 Commonwealth Games
Athletes (track and field) at the 2002 Commonwealth Games
Olympic athletes of Great Britain
Olympic silver medallists for Great Britain
Athletes (track and field) at the 1996 Summer Olympics
Athletes (track and field) at the 2000 Summer Olympics
Welsh Olympic medallists
World Athletics Championships athletes for Great Britain
World Athletics Championships medalists
European Athletics Championships medalists
Members of the Order of the British Empire
People educated at Stamford School
Alumni of Brunel University London
Sportspeople from Southampton
Medalists at the 1996 Summer Olympics
Olympic silver medalists in athletics (track and field)
World Athletics Championships winners
Medallists at the 1998 Commonwealth Games
Medallists at the 2002 Commonwealth Games